Starychi is a village in western Ukraine, specifically in Yavoriv Raion of Lviv Oblast. It has an area of 1.06 km2, a population of 3,443 as of the 2001 census, a population density of 3,248 (per km2), and an elevation of 273 m.

References 

 Старичі
 https://web.archive.org/web/20181101062809/http://starychi-ugcc.org.ua/ сайт церкви Різдва Пресвятої Богородиці в селі Старичі
Villages in Yavoriv Raion